John I, Count of Sponheim (born before 1206; died 1266) was a German count. He belonged to the house of Sponheim and ruled the county of Sponheim from 1218 to 1266. He inherited the county of Sayn.

House of Sponheim
1266 deaths
Year of birth uncertain